Basket willow is a common name for several plants and may refer to:

Salix purpurea, native to Europe and western Asia
Salix viminalis